A priest hole is a hiding place for a priest built into many of the principal Catholic houses of England, Wales and Ireland during the period when Catholics were persecuted by law. When Queen Elizabeth I came to the throne in 1558, there were several Catholic plots designed to remove her and severe measures were taken against Catholic priests. Many great houses had a priest hole built so that the presence of a priest could be concealed when searches were made of the building. They were concealed in walls, under floors, behind wainscoting and other locations and were often successful in concealing their occupant.

Many priest holes were designed by Jesuit lay brother Nicholas Owen, who spent much of his life building priest holes to protect the lives of persecuted priests. After the Gunpowder Plot, Owen himself was captured, taken to the Tower of London and tortured to death on the rack. He was canonised as a martyr by Pope Paul VI in 1970.

Background
The measures put in force shortly after Elizabeth's accession became much harsher after the Rising of the North (1569) and the Babington Plot in particular, the utmost severity of the law being enforced against seminary priests. "Priest hunters" were tasked to collect information and locate any priests. An Act was passed prohibiting a member of the Roman Catholic Church from celebrating the rites of his faith on pain of forfeiture for the first offence, a year's imprisonment for the second, and imprisonment for life for the third.  All those who refused to take the Oath of Supremacy were called "recusants" and were guilty of high treason. A law was also enacted which provided that if any "papist" should be found converting an Anglican, or other Protestant, to Catholicism, both would suffer death for high treason. In November 1591, a priest was hanged before the door of a house in Gray's Inn Fields for having said Mass there the month previously. Laws against seminary priests and "Recusants" were enforced with great severity after the Gunpowder Plot (1605) episode during James I's reign.  Arrest for a priest meant imprisonment, and often torture and execution.

Location and use

England's castles and country houses commonly had some precaution in the event of a surprise, such as a secret means of concealment or escape that could be used at a moment's notice. However, in the time of legal persecution the number of secret chambers and hiding-places increased in the houses of the old Catholic families. These often took the form of apartments or chapels in secluded parts of the houses, or in the roof space, where Mass could be celebrated with the utmost privacy and safety. Nearby there was usually an artfully contrived hiding-place, not only for the officiating priest to slip into in case of emergency, but also to provide a place where the vestments, sacred vessels, and altar furniture could be stored on short notice.  Priest's holes were built in fireplaces, attics and staircases and were largely constructed between the 1550s and 1605.

Map of all buildings and sites known or believed to have Priest Holes

Nicholas Owen

Many such hiding places are attributed to a Jesuit lay brother, Nicholas Owen (died 1606), who devoted the greater part of his life to constructing these places to protect the lives of persecuted priests.

They were sometimes built as an offshoot from a chimney. Another favourite entrance was behind panelling; an example is Ripley Castle in North Yorkshire. Others were incorporated into water closets, for example at Chesterton Hall, near Cambridge. Harvington Hall in Worcestershire has seven priest holes throughout the house, including access through the main staircase, panelling, and a false fireplace.

After the Gunpowder Plot, Owen himself was captured at Hindlip Hall, Worcestershire, taken to the Tower of London and tortured to death on the rack. He was canonised as a martyr by Pope Paul VI in 1970.

Effectiveness
The effectiveness of priest holes was demonstrated by their success in baffling the exhaustive searches of the "pursuivants" (priest-hunters), described in contemporary accounts of the searches. Search-parties would bring with them skilled carpenters and masons and try every possible expedient, from systematic measurements and soundings to the physical tearing down of panelling and pulling up of floors. Another ploy would be for the searchers to pretend to leave and see if the priest would then emerge from hiding. He might be half-starved, cramped, sore with prolonged confinement, and almost afraid to breathe lest the least sound should throw suspicion upon the particular spot where he was concealed. Sometimes a priest could die from starvation or by lack of oxygen.

See also
Priest hunter
Anti-Catholicism in the United Kingdom
English and Irish Penal Laws
Come Rack! Come Rope!

References

External links

Secret Chambers and Hiding Places, by Allan Fea, an eText at Project Gutenberg, from which this article is derived.
Article in The Blackpool Gazette (16 October 2006): 'Priest hole found in Tudor Hall', featuring a priest hole discovered by the owner of Mains Hall, Singleton, Lancashire 
BBC Black Country feature (10 December 2005) about a priest hole in Moseley Old Hall, Wolverhampton, that harbored Charles II in 1651 as he fled from Cromwell's army

Webpage about the priest hole at Naworth Castle, Cumbria, with historical notes and video

History of Catholicism in England
History of Catholicism in Ireland
Rooms
Houses in England
Houses in Wales
Houses in Ireland
Types of secret places
Anti-Catholicism in England
Anti-Catholicism in Wales
Anti-Catholicism in Ireland